Michael Norman Shaw, Baron Shaw of Northstead (9 October 1920 – 8 January 2021) was a National Liberal and British Conservative Party politician who served as a Member of Parliament (MP) from 1960 to 1964 (as a National Liberal)  and from 1966 to 1992 for the Conservatives.

Career
Shaw was born in Leeds, and educated at Sedbergh School. Standing  first as a Conservative at the general election in May 1955, Shaw fought the safe Labour seat of Dewsbury, losing by over 7,000 votes. At the general election in October 1959, he  stood as a 'Liberal and Conservative'  and contested the Labour-held marginal constituency of Brighouse and Spenborough. He lost by only 47 votes to the sitting MP Lewis John Edwards, who died the following month.

At the resulting by-election in March 1960, Shaw won the seat for the National Liberals and Conservatives with a majority of 666 votes over Labour's Colin Jackson. Jackson regained the seat from Shaw for Labour at the 1964 general election, however, by a majority of 922. Shaw returned to Parliament at the 1966 general election, when he was elected for the safe Conservative constituency of Scarborough and Whitby; he was a Conservative for the rest of his political career. He held that seat until it was abolished for the February 1974 general election, when he was re-elected for the new Scarborough constituency. He continued to represent Scarborough until he retired at the 1992 general election, making a total of 30 years as an MP. He also served as a Member of the European Parliament (MEP) from 1974 until 1979, when MEPs were not directly elected, but were chosen by the House of Commons and House of Lords as delegates.

In the 1982 Birthday Honours Shaw received a Knighthood, having the accolade conferred by The Queen on 25 November 1982. Shaw was created a life peer on 30 September 1994 with the title Baron Shaw of Northstead, of Liversedge in the County of West Yorkshire. He retired from the 
House of Lords on 31 March 2015. Shaw was interviewed in 2012 as part of The History of Parliament's oral history project.

Personal life
Shaw died peacefully on 8 January 2021 at the age of 100. He was married to his wife Joan for 69 years. He was a father and grandfather, and latterly lived in Winchester. At the time of his death, he was the earliest elected living former National Liberal MP, and the oldest living former Conservative or National Liberal MP, being the only such surviving centenarian from either party.

References

 Times Guide to the House of Commons 1987,
UK General Elections since 1832

External links 
 

1920 births
2021 deaths
Shaw of Northstead
People educated at Sedbergh School
Knights Bachelor
Conservative Party (UK) MPs for English constituencies
UK MPs 1959–1964
UK MPs 1966–1970
UK MPs 1970–1974
UK MPs 1974
UK MPs 1974–1979
UK MPs 1979–1983
UK MPs 1983–1987
UK MPs 1987–1992
Politicians from Scarborough, North Yorkshire
Conservative Party (UK) MEPs
MEPs for the United Kingdom 1973–1979
Politicians awarded knighthoods
Politicians from Leeds
English centenarians
Men centenarians
National Liberal Party (UK, 1931) politicians
Life peers created by Elizabeth II